Desmopoda is a genus of moths in the family Sesiidae.

Species
Desmopoda bombiformis  Felder, 1874

References

Sesiidae